Heartland is an American sitcom that aired on CBS from March 20, 1989, until June 12, 1989. The series stars Brian Keith as an old-fashioned Nebraska farmer who moves in with his daughter (Katie Layman), son-in-law (Richard Gilliland) and their family. Keith's real-life daughter Daisy Keith plays one of his grandchildren. The show was created by Don Reo, and was produced by Impact Zone Productions in association with Witt/Thomas Productions and distributed by TeleVentures.

Premise
An old-fashioned farmer, B. L. McCutcheon, loses his farm and has to move in with his daughter's family in the fictional rural town of Pritchard, Nebraska.

Cast
Brian Keith as B.L. McCutcheon
Richard Gilliland as Tom Stafford
Katie Layman as Casey McCutcheon Stafford
Jason Kristofer as Johnny Stafford
Devin Ratray as Gus Stafford
Daisy Keith as Kim Stafford

Episodes

References

External links

1989 American television series debuts
1989 American television series endings
1980s American sitcoms
English-language television shows
CBS original programming
Television shows set in Nebraska
Television series by Sony Pictures Television